The Sudans (also known as the two Sudans or just Sudan) is a region in Northeast Africa comprising the sovereign countries of North Sudan and South Sudan. Until 2011, the region was united under a state known as the Republic of the Sudan.

Geography

The Sudans are situated in northern/northeastern Africa, with a  coastline bordering the Red Sea. The Sudans lie mostly between latitudes 3° and 22°N (the Wadi Halfa Salient and disputed Hala'ib triangle are north of 22°), and longitudes 21° and 39°E.

The terrain is generally flat plains, broken by several mountain ranges; in the west the Jebel Marra is the highest range; in the south is the highest mountain, Mount Kinyeti Imatong, near the border with Uganda; in the east are the Red Sea Hills.

The Blue and White Nile rivers meet in Khartoum to form the River Nile, which flows northwards through Egypt to the Mediterranean Sea. The White Nile within the Sudans has no significant tributaries.

The amount of rainfall increases towards the south. In the north there is the very dry Nubian Desert; in the south there are grasslands and tropical savanna. The Sudans’ rainy season lasts for about four months (June to September) in the north, and up to six months (May to October) in the south. The dry regions are plagued by sandstorms, known as haboob, which can completely block out the Sun. In the northern and western semi-desert areas, people rely on the scant rainfall for basic agriculture and many are nomadic, travelling with their herds of sheep and camels. Nearer the River Nile, there are well-irrigated farms growing cash crops.

There are several dams on the Blue and White Niles. Among them are the Sennar and Roseires Dams on the Blue Nile, and the Jebel Aulia Dam on the White Nile. There is also Lake Nubia on the Sudanese-Egyptian border.

Rich mineral resources are available in the Sudans including:

Asbestos
Chromite
Cobalt
Copper
Gold
Granite
Gypsum
Iron
Kaolin
Lead
Manganese
Mica
Natural Gas
Nickel
Petroleum
Silver
Tin
Uranium
Zinc

Desertification is a serious problem in the Sudans. There is also concern over soil erosion. Agricultural expansion, both public and private, has proceeded without conservation measures. The consequences have manifested themselves in the form of deforestation, soil desiccation, and the lowering of soil fertility and the water table.

The nation's wildlife is threatened by hunting. As of 2001, twenty-one mammal species and nine bird species are endangered, as well as two species of plants. endangered species include: the waldrapp, northern white rhinoceros, tora hartebeest, slender-horned gazelle, and hawksbill turtle. The Sahara oryx has become extinct in the wild.

In May 2007, it was announced that hundreds of wild elephants had been located on a previously unknown, treeless island in the Sudd swampland region of (then) southern Sudan. The exact location was being kept secret to protect the animals from poachers.

See also
South Sudan–Sudan relations

References

Geography of South Sudan
Geography of Sudan